The Institute for Computer Science and Control (in short SZTAKI) is a Hungarian research institute in Budapest, founded in 1964.

Scope 

Its primary tasks include basic and application-oriented research in an interdisciplinary setting in the fields of engineering, computer science, information technology, intelligent systems as well as process control, multimedia and wide area networking. Further tasks of SZTAKI include training, contract-based target research, development and expert support for domestic and foreign industrial, governmental and other partners. The institute also operates a public advice service on knowledge-transfer of up-to-date research results and state-of-the-art technology to university students. SZTAKI has wide external relationships and different groups within the institute work on projects for well-known international and Hungarian companies and the number of European Union projects is also impressing. Its staff has more than 300 full-time employees.

International scientific relations 
SZTAKI is a member of the Khronos Group, World Wide Web Consortium, ERCIM, and has a joint venture - Epic InnoLabs - with Fraunhofer Society

Research activity 

Basic research - Main domains

 Computer science
 Systems- and control theory
 Engineering and business intelligence
 Machine perception and human-computer interaction

R&D activities

 Vehicles and transportation systems
 Production informatics and logistics
 Energy and sustainable development
 Security and surveillance
 Networks, networking systems and services, distributed computing

Departments 

 3D Internet-based Control and Communications Laboratory
 Computational Optical Sensing and Processing Laboratory
 eLearning Department
 Distributed Events Analysis Research Laboratory
 Department of Distributed Systems
 Geometric Modelling and Computer Vision Laboratory
 Network Security Department
 Informatics Laboratory
 Research Laboratory on Engineering & Management Intelligence
 Laboratory of Parallel and Distributed Systems
 Systems and Control Lab

Public services 

 W3C Hungarian Office
 SZTAKI Dictionary
 SZTAKI Web Search
 KOPI Plagiarism Detection System
 SZTAKI Desktop GRID
 SZTAKI WS-PGRADE Portal
 NDA@SZTAKI
 EMIS MIRROR
 Sztakipédia Wiki editor
 Guide@hand audio tourist guide application

References 

 Fordítást is figyel a SZTAKI plágiumkeresője (in Hungarian)
 Demokratizálja a Desktop Grid-et a SZTAKI (in Hungarian)
 Sztakipédia: itt a tudásmegosztás hatékonyabb módja (in Hungarian)
 A SZTAKI szorgalmazza a honlapok akadálymentességét (in Hungarian)
 A jogsértő fordítást is leleplezi a KOPI program (in Hungarian)
 Virtuális séta Ottlikkal (in Hungarian)
 Valós idejű 3D-technológia a SZTAKI-ban (in Hungarian)
 Különleges algafajok élnek a téli Balatonban (in Hungarian)
 Az MTA SZTAKI egyedülálló módszerével vizsgálják a Balaton vízminőségét (in Hungarian)
 Itt a zsebben megbúvó tökéletes útitárs (in Hungarian)
 Miből lesz a robot MÁV-pénztáros? (in Hungarian)
 Bosch:egyedülálló K+F együttműködésről kezdődtek tárgyalások (in Hungarian)
 Lewis Hamilton városnézése a Guide@Hand-del (in Hungarian)
 3D internet alapú kontroll- és kommunikációs laboratórium épült Budapesten (in Hungarian)
 Dr. Idegen Toll (in Hungarian)
 Mi a baj a magyar kutatókkal? (in Hungarian)
 Simonyi Károly-díj két magyar tudósnak (in Hungarian)
 Világcégek az MTA kutatóintézeteivel (in Hungarian)
 Magyar elsőségek (in Hungarian)
 A SZTAKI vezetésével alakul meg a Mesterséges Intelligencia Kiválósági Központ (in Hungarian)

External links 

 http://mta.hu/english/
 http://www.sztaki.hu/en
 https://www.youtube.com/user/mtasztakipr

Hungarian Academy of Sciences
Information technology research institutes
Organizations established in 1964
1964 establishments in Hungary